Route 80 is a  C-shaped state highway in southeastern Massachusetts. The highway is signed as west–east.

Route description
Route 80 starts at Carver Road (formerly U.S. Route 44) in  the West Plymouth section of Plymouth. Due to the removal of Route 44, this is an unusual instance that a numbered route does not have its terminus with another numbered route. Though signed East, Route 80 heads west in the Plymouth section, and then generally north and northwest after crossing the town line into Kingston, all for the first , and is a state highway, before finally turning east at Elm Street and becoming a town-maintained road.

The highway crosses over the new highway portion of U.S. Route 44 in Kingston, but there is no interchange; however, Commerce Way in Plymouth provides access between the two highways. Route 80 ends at Route 3A in Kingston along the Jones River between Routes 3 and 106.

The state highway portion of the road is also concurrent with the Claire Saltonstall Bikeway which runs for 135 miles between Boston and Cape Cod.

Points of interest
Parting Ways Cemetery, a  site containing the burial grounds of four former slaves who fought in the American Revolutionary War and their families, is on this highway in Plymouth, near the Kingston town line.

Sacred Heart High School and Camp Mishannock, a summer camp for girls along Lake Providence, are on the Kingston portion of this highway.

Major intersections

References

080
Kingston, Massachusetts
Plymouth, Massachusetts
Transportation in Plymouth County, Massachusetts